Manava Bharati India International School (MBIIS) is an international school located in Panchsheel Park, South Delhi, India, adjacent to Sadhna Enclave, built on eight acres.

Affiliation
The school has permanent affiliation from the CBSE and is managed by The Manava Bharati Institute of Child Education and Child Psychology Society, a registered body under the Indian Societies Registration Act of 1860.

History
Manava Bharati was the project of founder Chairman the late Dr. Durga Prasad Panday. An academician and educationist, Dr. Pandey was educated at Banares Hindu University, India and the universities of Cambridge, England and Leiden, the Netherlands. He was associated with the Indian National Freedom Struggle in both; its revolutionary and Gandhian programmes at the cost of suffering imprisonment twice.

He was a close compatriot of another revolutionary, Pt. Madan Mohan Malviya who suggested his name as a Hindi/Sanskrit teacher to Guru Rabindra Nath Tagore, who in turn invited him to join the Vishwa Bharati.

It was poet Tagore who motivated him to pursue his higher studies and proceed to Europe where he took a Ph.D. from Kings College, Cambridge University, England. 'Babuji' as he was fondly known, decided to dedicate his life to the cause of child education. He followed his inclination to develop the concept of child education, which he had nurtured while in association with Poet Rabindra Nath Tagore at the 'Vishwa Bharati', prior to leaving for England.

In 1941, he founded the Manava Bharati institution, a centre for learning on the lines of 'Shantiniketan' and engaged in developing it. Manava Bharati has developed into four centres at Mussoorie, Dehradun, Delhi and Varanasi. Babuji's philanthropy earned him 'The Order of the St. John' in 1966.

Manava Bharati flourished at 'Shakti Ashram' in Rajpur (midway between Dehradun and Mussoorie) in Uttaranchal. The institute's foundation stone was laid by Mahatma Gandhi.

To accommodate the increase of students in 1948, the school relocated to a big estate called ‘Dumbarni’ in Mussoorie, ‘The Queen of Hills’. This estate had once belonged to the Church of England where it ran a school for English girls.

The idea of the development of Manava Bharati India International School, Delhi sprung from a chance meeting Dr. Pandey had during the early 1970s with his friend the Late Dr. Aditya Nath Jha the first Lt. Governor of Delhi.

Religious representatives from all over the world laid the foundation stone of Manava Bharati India International School Delhi, on 11 February 1974.

In 1980 Capt. Vishwakant Pandey, the Chairman, an ex-serviceman and Mrs. Bharati Pandey, the Principal (now Director) ; an educationist, took over the school.

The school has Junior, Middle and Senior wings.

Campus Highlights
Manava Bharati is situated at Panchsheel Park (South), adjacent to Sadhna Enclave, New Delhi. The school’s campus is spread over approximately eight acres.

Sports
Every major sport is played in Manava Bharati. major tournaments are annual sport day, inter-school tournaments, inter-house tournaments and zonal tournaments. On 21 April 2017 annual athletics meet included races for 100m, 200m, 400m, 800m and relay. The school football team, cricket team, Badminton team and basketball team took part in Zonal Tournaments in Delhi.

This year the Manava Bharati team was victorious at the Rocksport Adventure Challenge for the third year in succession.  Winning this race demands outstanding leadership along with physical and mental strength. Eighty leading schools from Delhi and NCR participated in the competition. Our senior team consisting of Arun Kumar, Vishal Mallick, Kinjal Varshney & Fariha Sidiqi won the Second Prize which came with a cash award from Firefox.

Notable alumni
The school has had many incredible students pass through its doors.

References

https://www.edustoke.com/delhi/manava-bharati-india-international-school-panchsheel-park-residential
Schools in Delhi